The 33rd Filmfare Awards South ceremony honoring the winners of the best of South Indian cinema in 1985 was an event held on August 10, 1986 at Music Academy Chennai.
The president of this year's function is Mr. A. C. Muthiah, the eminent industrialist.

Awards

Kannada cinema

Malayalam cinema

Tamil cinema

Telugu cinema

Special Awards

Awards Presentation

 Parvathamma Rajkumar (Best Film Kannada) Received Award from K. Balaje
 Joy Thomas (Best Film Malayalam)  Received Award from Karthik
 Rama Rao Receives Ramoji Rao Award (Best Film Telugu) from Gemini Ganesan
 K. Balachander (Best Film Tamil) Received Award from Sivakumar
 N. Lakshmi Narayan (Best Director Kannada) Received Award from S. P. Muthuraman
 Balu Mahendra (Best Director Malayalam) Received Award from Sowcar Janaki
 Singeetam Srinivasa Rao daughter Receives Singeetam Srinivasa Rao Award (Best Director Telugu) from Sumalatha
 Fazil (Best Director Tamil) Received Award from Rajasekhar
 Saritha (Best Actress Kannada) Received Award from Padmini
 Nadhiya (Best Actress Malayalam) Received Award from Revathi
 Ms. Vani Babu Receives Vijayashanti Award (Best Actress Telugu) from K. G. George
 Radha (Best Actress Tamil) Received Award from Thirunavukkarasu
 Rajkumar (Best Actor Kannada) Received Award from A. C. Muthiah
 Chiranjeevi (Best Actor Telugu) Received Award from Suhasini
 Puneeth Rajkumar (Special Award) Received Award from Amala
 Padmini (For Outstanding Contribution to South Indian Films) Received Award from A. C. Muthiah

References

 Filmfare Magazine September 1–15, 1986.

General

External links
 
 

Filmfare Awards South